This article contains polls on voters' intentions regarding the 2023 Argentine general election, which will elect the country's president and vice president for the 2023–2027 period.

First round

Graph

By political party

2023

2021-2022

By candidate

Before candidates definition

Hypothetical scenarios

Second round

Before candidates definition

References 

Opinion polling in Argentina
2023 elections in Argentina
Argentina